IDGAF is an acronym for "I don't give a fuck". It may refer to:

 "I Don't Give a Fuck", also known as "IDGAF", a song by 2Pac
 "IDGAF" (song), by Dua Lipa on her eponymous 2017 album
 "IDGAF", a song by Nelly on the 2013 album M.O.
 "IDGAF", a song by CJ Fly on the 2016 album Flytrap
 "IDGAF", a 2019 song by Ängie
 "I.D.G.A.F.", a song by Breathe Carolina from the 2009 album Hello Fascination
 "I.D.G.A.F.", a song by Daz Dilly from the 2014 album Weed Money
 #IDGAF, a 2013 mixtape by Ludacris
 IDGAF, a 2013 music video featuring Snootie Wild
 "IDGAF Suite", a song by Billy Hart from the album Oshumare
 "IDGAF", a song by Lil Peep from the album Come Over When You're Sober, Pt. 2 
 "IDGAF", a 2022 song by 42 Dugg
 "IDGAF", a 2022 song by BoyWithUke ft. blackbear from the album Serotonin Dreams
 "IDGAF". a song by As It Is from the album I Went to Hell and Back

See also 
 I Don't Give a Fuck (disambiguation)
 "The F Bomb (IDGAFS)", a 2012 single by EarthGang
 "IDGAFOS", a 2011 song by American record producer Dillon Francis